Royal Air Force Oakington or more simply RAF Oakington was a Royal Air Force station located  north of Oakington, Cambridgeshire, England and  north-west of Cambridge.

History

Second World War
Construction was started in 1939, but was affected by the outbreak of war. The original plan called for Type-C hangars but two type J were erected instead. It was used by No. 2 Group in July 1940 for No. 218 Squadron which had recently returned from France. In September, Oakington was passed on for the No. 2 Group which stationed the first Short Stirling Squadron No. 7. The newly formed No. 3 Photographic Reconnaissance Unit RAF started to use RAF Oakington to conduct high altitude work for Bomber Command's target. However, there were poor surface conditions at RAF Oakington so No. 3 PRU often operated from RAF Alconbury.

Post war

During the 1950s RAF Oakington was an Advanced Flying Training School, No. 5 Flying Training School RAF (5 FTS), which reformed at the airfield on 1 June 1954. Its initial role was to convert trainee pilots to jets using De Havilland Vampire FB5 single seat jets and Vampire T11 twin-seat jets. In March 1962 these types were exchanged for the Vickers Varsity T.1 twin piston-engine pilot trainers. 5 FTS was disbanded on 31 December 1974 when the need for training on piston engined aircraft reduced. The airfield was then closed, becoming a British Army barracks.

The airfield's land area had contracted after the war, and much evidence of this former military use is visible in farmland surrounding the current perimeter.

British Army use
The barracks were used in the late 1970s and through the 1980s as a transit camp for units moving between Germany and Northern Ireland. It was also a permanent base for 657 Squadron Army Air Corps in the 1980s. The barracks were occupied by the https://www.army.mod.uk/who-we-are/corps-regiments-and-units/infantry/royal-anglian-regiment/1st-battalion-the-royal-anglian-regiment/ from 1980 to 1984, the 1st Bn The Worcestershire and Sherwood Foresters Regiment (29th and 45th) from 1986 to 1989, Royal Highland Fusiliers from 1989 to 1993 and by the Cheshire Regiment from 1993 to 1996.

Immigration Reception Centre
In 2000 the station domestic area was leased to the Home Office, and converted for use as Oakington Immigration Reception Centre until November 2010.

Future use
Since 2007 plans have been developed to build Northstowe, a new settlement of 9,500 houses on the site. Demolition of parts of the site commenced in late January 2011 by the contractor Sovereign Plant Ltd. Work started on the first 1500 homes and related facilities in 2014.

Bibliography
 Sturtivant, Ray, Hamlin, John and Halley, J.J., Royal Air Force Flying Training and Support Units, 1997, Air-Britain (Historians) Ltd,

References

External links

Pictures of RAF aircraft taken at the base

Royal Air Force stations in Cambridgeshire
Royal Air Force stations of World War II in the United Kingdom